Roger Hubert (1903–1964) was a French cinematographer who worked on more than 90 films.

Selected filmography
 Sables (1927)
 End of the World (1931)
 American Love (1931)
 Fanny (1932)
 Jocelyn (1933)
 The Battle (1934)
 Pension Mimosas (1935)
 Lucrezia Borgia (1935)
 Remous (1935) 
 Divine (1935)
 The Man of the Hour (1937)
 The Woman Thief (1938)
 Beautiful Star (1938)
 The Little Thing (1938)
 Paris-New York (1940)
 First Ball (1941)
 Les Visiteurs du Soir (1942)
 The Phantom Baron (1943)
 Children of Paradise (1945)
 La Fiancée des ténèbres (1945)
 The Queen's Necklace (1946)
 The Last Days of Pompeii (1950)
 Judgement of God (1952)
 Leathernose (1952)
 Thérèse Raquin (1953)
 The Air of Paris  (1954)
 Queen Margot (1954)
 The Lovers of Lisbon (1955)
 Paris Holiday (1958)
 Croesus (1960)
 Bombs on Monte Carlo (1960)
 Dynamite Jack (1961)
 Cocagne (1961)

Bibliography
 Oscherwitz, Dayna & Higgins, MaryEllen. The A to Z of French Cinema. Scarecrow Press, 2009.

External links

1903 births
1964 deaths
French cinematographers
People from Seine-Saint-Denis